Claude Berger (January 20, 1679, Paris – May 22, 1712, Passy) was a French doctor and chemist.

Biography 
He was a medical doctor from the Faculty of Paris and received his degree in medicine in 1669, after presenting a thesis under the presidency of Guy-Crescent Fagon, first physician to the king, against the use of tobacco. Claude Berger was related to Fagon, but the latter only knew him during this thesis. He then granted her his friendship and protection. He worked with Joseph Pitton de Tournefort on the study of plants who appreciated him and made him enter as his pupil at the Royal Academy of Sciences, on February 14, 1699. After various arrangements inside the Academy, he became a pupil of Guillaume Homberg on January 27, 1700. Having been received as a doctor of medicine, he was obliged to give lessons at the Schools of Paris for two years, where he obtained some success. His father took him with him to visit his sick and being ill replaced him for the last two years of his life, from 1703. He succeeded his father after his death and was appointed doctor regent, in 1705. In 1708 he obtained the position of medical adviser to the king for 22,000 pounds, which requires him to be present at Versailles the first quarter of each year.

References 

1679 births
1712 deaths
French chemists
17th-century French physicians
17th-century French chemists